Cuddalore District is one of the 38 districts in the state of Tamil Nadu in India.

History 
Since ancient times, the old town has been a seaport. Through the centuries, Cuddalore has been subject to a number of foreign powers including the Netherlands, Portugal, France and more recently, the British. In the 1600s, the French and English came to Cuddalore for trade and business. The French established a settlement at Pondicherry and the British at Cuddalore. The French and English, while engaged in the Seven Years' War, fought the naval Battle of Cuddalore on 29 April 1758. It was an indecisive battle between a British squadron, under Vice-Admiral George Pocock and a French squadron, under Comte d'Aché and the newly appointed Governor General Comte Thomas Lally. Cuddalore surrendered to French troops on 29 April 1758.

From 1789 to 1794, there was further unrest in Cuddalore due to the War of American Independence and the Second Anglo-Mysore War culminating in the siege of Cuddalore, after which the town was returned to Britain as part of a peace treaty. In 1782, during the Second Anglo Mysore war, the French troops allied with Tipu Sultan and won over the British, after which Cuddalore became a chief port against the French. In 1783, General James Stuart (1735–1793) led his troops to fend off French troops. There were five different naval actions off the coast during the same year, all of which were indecisive.

Some streets in Cuddalore retain British names such as Clive Street, Wellington Street, Sloper Street, Canning Street, Rope Street (Rope Street, Wellington Street, Sloper Street and Canning Street jointly known as Salangukara Village), Lawrence Road and Imperial Road. The Cuddalore Central Prison, opened in 1865, is an historically important landmark. Subramanya Bharathi and other political leaders served prison terms there.

Cuddalore district is prone to natural calamities having experienced landfalls of major cyclones formed in the Bay of Bengal region. Apart from the cyclones, 2004 Tsunami caused massive damages to life and property in Cuddalore and its adjacent Nagapattinam district. Cyclone Thane, which made landfall here, caused major loss to life and property.

Tsunami waves that followed the 2004 Indian Ocean earthquake near Sumatra hit the eastern coast of India on 26 December 2004 at 08:32 am, resulting in 572 casualties. Several fishing hamlets disappeared, while Silver Beach and the historically important Cuddalore Port were devastated. Fort St. David survived without damage. In 2012, Cyclone Thane caused widespread damage to crops and buildings.

Cuddalore district was among those most severely affected by the 2015 South India floods. Six of the district's 13 blocks suffered extensive damage during the floods in November. The resumption of heavy rainfall from 1 December once again inundated the Cuddalore municipality and the district, displacing tens of thousands of people. Rains continued through 9 December. Despite the state government and individuals sending rescue teams and tonnes of relief materials to the district, thousands of those affected continued to lack basic supplies due to inadequate distribution efforts; this resulted in several relief lorries being stopped and looted by survivors. Large swaths of Cuddalore city and the district remained inundated as of 10 December, with thousands of residents marooned by floodwaters and over 60,000 hectares of farmland inundated; over 30,000 people had been evacuated to relief camps.

Geography 

The district has an area of 3,564 km². It is bounded on the north by Viluppuram District and Kallakurichi district, on the east by the Bay of Bengal, on the northeast by Puducherry district of the union territory Puducherry, on the south by Mayiladuthurai district, on the west by Perambalur District and by a small part with Thanjavur district. The district is drained by Gadilam and Pennaiyar rivers in the north, Vellar and Kollidam River (Coleroon) in the south.

Economy 
In 2006 the Ministry of Panchayati Raj named Cuddalore one of the country's 250 most backward districts (out of a total of 640). It is one of the six districts in Tamil Nadu currently receiving funds from the Backward Regions Grant Fund Programme (BRGF).

Demographics 

According to 2011 census, Cuddalore district had a population of 2,605,914 with a sex-ratio of 987 females for every 1,000 males, much above the national average of 929. 33.97% of the population lived in urban areas. A total of 279,950 were under the age of six, constituting 147,644 males and 132,306 females. Scheduled Castes and Scheduled Tribes accounted for 29.32% and 0.6% of the population, respectively. The average literacy of the district was 79%, compared to the national average of 72.99%. The district had a total of 635,578 households. There were a total of 1,169,880 workers, comprising 136,035 cultivators, 325,599 main agricultural labourers, 19,151 in house hold industries, 356,486 other workers, 332,609 marginal workers, 29,135 marginal cultivators, 213,813 marginal agricultural labourers, 12,876 marginal workers in household industries and 76,785 other marginal workers.

At the time of the 2011 census, 97.59% of the population spoke Tamil and 0.96% Telugu as their first language.

Politics 

|}

Divisions 

Cuddalore District comprises 10 taluks, 13 Blocks, 7 Municipalities and 16 Town Panchayats.

Urban centres 

Cuddalore district consists of the following urban regions (cities):

Bhuvanagiri
Chidambaram
Cuddalore
Kattumannarkoil
Kurinjipadi
Neyveli
Nellikuppam
Panruti
Pennadam
Srimushnam
Vadalur
Virudhachalam

Agriculture 
The district contributes significantly to the Tamil Nadu state production of cashew nut and jack fruit.

Tourist attractions 

 Pichavaram, one of the world's largest mangrove forests
 Silver Beach at Devanampatinam (Cuddalore)
 Veeranam Lake, Kattumannarkoil
 Marine Biology, Parangipettai, Chidambaram taluk
 Saamiyaarpettai Beach, near Parangipettai, Chidambaram taluk
 Pataleeswarar temple, a Hindu temple, built during the 7th century is the most prominent landmark in Cuddalore. The name, Thirupathipuliyur, is associated with the legend behind the temple. The temple is revered in the verses of 7th-century Saiva saints Appar and Tirugnanasambandar in their works in Tevaram.
Chidambaram Natarajar Temple
 The Devanathaswami Temple, located in Thiruvanthipuram, is another Hindu pilgrimage site located in the outskirts of Cuddalore.
 Veerattaneswarar Temple, near Panruti
 Sri boovaraha Swami temple, Sri Nithishwarar temple, Srimushnam

Villages
 

Kachirayanatham
Rayanallur Village
Silambinathanpettai
Uyyakondaravi
Valasakkadu
Vazhmangalam
Kanjankollai

See also 
List of districts of Tamil Nadu
List of educational institutions in Cuddalore District

References

External links 

 Cuddalore District
 Cuddalore District Profile

 
Districts of Tamil Nadu